The Sarajevo metropolitan area is the largest agglomeration in Bosnia and Herzegovina, representing the wider area of the capital Sarajevo with an estimated population of 555,210 people.

It consists of Sarajevo Canton with a population of 413,593 inhabitants, East Sarajevo with 61,516 inhabitants and the municipalities of Breza, Kiseljak, Kreševo and Visoko. The Sarajevo metropolitan area is economically the strongest area of Bosnia and Herzegovina and generates more than 45% of the Bosnia and Herzegovina GDP.

Urban areas

References

Metropolitan area
Geography of Bosnia and Herzegovina
Sarajevo Canton
Metropolitan areas of Europe